Bonny may refer to:

People
Anne Bonny (1702–c. 1782), notorious woman pirate
Bonny Sengupta, Indian Bengali Film Actor 
Bonny Barry (born 1960), Australian politician
Bonny Hicks (1968–1997), model and writer
Jan Bonny (born 1979), German film director
Johan Bonny (born 1955), Belgian Roman Catholic bishop
Bonny Warner (born 1962), American luger, bobsledder, and airline pilot

Places
Kingdom of Bonny, a realm in what is now Nigeria
Bonny, Kentucky, a community in the United States
Bonny, Nigeria, a town and Local Government Area, and former capital of the Kingdom of Bonny
Bight of Bonny, a body of water off the coast of west Africa
Bonny River, Nigeria
Bonny Island, in the Niger Delta of Nigeria
Bonny Lakes, two small lakes in Oregon, United States

Other uses
Ibani tribe or Bonny tribe, an ethnic group in Rivers State, Nigeria
Hurricane Bonny, the name of four tropical cyclones in the eastern Pacific Ocean
NNS Bonny, a Nigerian vessel
"Bonny" (instrumental), performed by the Australian hard rock band AC/DC
A pigtail monkey who spent almost 9 days in outer space on Biosatellite 3
A word of late Middle English origin, with uncertain etymology, meaning pleasing or pretty
The Bonny, a 2020 album by Gerry Cinnamon
"The Bonny" (song), the title track from the album

See also
Boni (disambiguation)
Bonnie (disambiguation)